Mathieu Claude Daniel Pruski (born 15 April 1997) better known by the stage name PLK (acronym for Polak), is a French rapper of Polish descent. His father is Polish with his grandfather immigrating from Poland to France in World War II. His mother is Corsican. Pruski grew up in 14e arrondissement in Paris. He started writing lyrics when he was nine and composing when he was 13. Being called "mini Polak", he adopted Polak (PLK) as his artistic name to emphasize his Polish roots. At 14, he was part of the formation La Confrérie alongside Ormaz and Zeu. He later became a member of the formation Panama Bende a band formed by seven young artists from Paris together releasing the EP Bende Mafia in 2016 and the album ADN in 2017.

In 2015 and 2016, he released two EPs, Peur de me tromper and Dedans. He launched a solo career by signing with the label Panenka Music in June 2017 after having collaborated with Fonky Flav' known as "Fonk", a member of the rap group 1995. Fonk had been a founder of the label Panenka Music. Soon he released two  mixtapes Ténébreux and Platinum which gained him greater fame. In both he featured the rapper Krisy. He also appeared in Rentre dans le Cercle produced by the rapper Sofiane. He collaborated with rapper Lefa from Sexion d'Assaut and appeared in the soundtrack of Taxi 5 with the track "Lambo" in collaboration with Mister V. Other collaborations included rappers SCH, Nekfeu and Polish rapper Paluch.

In October 2018, PLK released his first album Polak, that was certified platinum. His follow up album Mental released in September 2019 is his highest ranking album so far.

Discography

Albums

Mixtapes

EPs
2015: Peur de me tromper 
2016: Dedans

Singles

As lead artist

*Did not appear in the official Belgian Ultratop 50 charts, but rather in the bubbling under Ultratip charts.

As featured artist

Other charting songs

*Did not appear in the official Belgian Ultratop 50 charts, but rather in the bubbling under Ultratip charts.

References

French rappers
1997 births
Living people
French people of Polish descent
French people of Corsican descent